Wabano may refer to:

 Lake Wabano, La Tuque, Quebec, Canada
 Wabano River, La Tuque, Quebec, Canada